Revolutionary Workers Party−RWP, initially known as Revolutionary Samasamaja Party is a Trotskyist political party in Sri Lanka.

History
The party was formed in 1968, as a split from the Lanka Sama Samaja Party (Revolutionary). The founding secretary of the party was Edmund Samarakkoddy. 

The party adopted its current name in 1973.

RSP had denounced the 1971 uprising of the Janatha Vimukthi Peramuna as adventuristic.

In the latter half of the 1970s, RWP developed contacts with the international Spartacist tendency. The relationship with the Spartacists was broken in 1979, and in 1981 RWP suffered a split when a minority formed the Spartacist Group India/Lanka.

After the break with the Spartacists, RWP developed close contacts to an Italian split-off from iSt, the Revolutionary Workers Group (GOR). In 1991 RWP was one of the founder of the International Liaison Committee of Communists, an international Trotskyist tendency that is now defunct.

Samarakkoddy died in 1992. Little remains of the RWP today.

Communist parties in Sri Lanka
Trotskyist organisations in Sri Lanka
Political parties established in 1968
1968 establishments in Ceylon